Dera, or Kanakuru, is a West Chadic language of Nigeria.

References

West Chadic languages
Languages of Nigeria